Stockport County Borough was created by the Municipal Corporations Act 1835 when the existing Borough of Stockport was reformed as a municipal borough. Until 1835 the town was governed by a charter dating from circa 1220 granted by Ranulph de Blondeville, 4th Earl of Chester. The municipal borough consisted of parts of Cheshire, namely the township of Stockport and the neighbouring areas of Edgeley and Portwood and part of Heaton Norris in Lancashire.

Under the terms of the Local Government Act 1888 Stockport was constituted a county borough in 1889, independent of the county councils of Cheshire and Lancashire. The county borough continued to be divided between the two counties for judicial and lieutenancy purposes until 1894, when it was placed entirely in Cheshire.

Under the Stockport Borough Extension Act 1901 the borough was enlarged, absorbing the urban district of Reddish in Lancashire as well a number of parts of Cheshire parishes. The Stockport (Extension) Order 1913 saw a further enlargement with the absorption of Heaton Norris Urban District from Lancashire.

The county borough was abolished by the Local Government Act 1972 with its territory forming part of the Metropolitan Borough of Stockport district of Greater Manchester.

Corporation
The 1835 Act designated all qualified residents of the town as "burgesses" and formed them into a body corporate by the name of the "Mayor, aldermen and Burgesses of the Borough of Stockport". The burgesses elected a town council, which initially consisted of a mayor, six aldermen and 18 councillors. The borough was divided into six wards: Edgeley, Heaton Norris, Middle, Portwood, St Mary's and St Thomas's, each returning one alderman and three councillors.

In 1894 the number of wards was increased to fourteen: Cale Green, Edgeley, Heaton Lane, Heaviley, Hempshaw Lane, Holywood, Lancashire Hill, Old Road, Portwood, St Mary's, St Thomas's, Shaw Heath, Spring Bank and Vernon. The corporation was accordingly enlarged to 14 aldermen and 42 councillors. Additional wards were added when the borough was extended: Reddish North and Reddish South in 1901 and Heaton Norris North and South in 1913. The corporation subsequently had 18 aldermen and 54 councillors. The ward boundaries were subsequently redrawn in 1935, although they remained 18 in number: Spring Bank ward was abolished and a new ward of Davenport created. In 1971 the wards were completely redrawn and bore the following names: Adswood, Brinnington, Cale Green, Cheadle Heath, Davenport, Edgeley, Heaton Chapel, Heaton Moor, Heaton Norris, Heaviley, Lancashire Hill, Little Moor, Longford, Manor, Offerton, Reddish Green and Vernon.

Political control
In the early years of the council, political labels were not used. By the 1880s, however, a Liberal administration was in control. In 1904 the Liberals lost their overall majority after "twenty years". In the following year Conservatives gained control. 1905 also saw the first election of Labour councillors. Conservatives held power until 1929, when they lost their majority, but remaining the largest party on the council. From 1934 to 1945 Conservatives once again controlled the borough. The council was under no overall control from 1945 to 1947, when the Conservatives regained control, holding the council for seven years. In 1954 Labour took power for the first time, and held the borough until 1968. In 1968 Conservatives regained control, with Labour returning to power in the final borough election prior to abolition in 1972.

Coat of arms

In 1836 the new borough corporation adopted a common seal, incorporating an unofficial coat of arms. The shield was blue with three gold lozenges between nine cross-crosslets. This was said to the arms of the Stopford or Stockport family, Barons of Stockport. On either side of the shield was a lion and the figure of Britannia. Above the shield was a mural crown and a banner inscribed "Municipal Reform January 1836"

On 5 December 1932, the county borough obtained a grant of arms and crest from the College of Arms. This consisted of the unofficial arms within a gold bordure or border. On the bordure were placed three garbs or wheatsheaves and three double-headed eagles. The garbs represented the county of Cheshire, while the eagles were taken from the arms of the de Eton family. The crest was a representation of the town's medieval castle.

On 1 December 1959 an additional grant of supporters was made. These were two white lions each with a gold and red collar in a "vairy" pattern. The lions were from the arms of the de Warren family who held the manor of Stockport until 1826. The vair pattern was from the arms of the Ferrers family, Earls of Derby. A disc hung from the collar of each lion: one bearing the red Lancashire rose, the other a Cheshire garb.

The full blazon of the arms was as follows:
Azure semée of cross crosslets three lozenges Or; a bordure of the last charged with three garbs and as many double headed eagles displayed alternately of the first. And for a Crest: issuant from a mural crown Or a mount vert, thereon a castle with two towers proper. Mantled azure, doubled Or. Supporters: On either side a lion argent that to the dexter gorged with a collar vairy Or and gules pendent therefrom by a chain gold a plate charged with a rose gules barbed and seeded proper; that to the sinister likewise collared and pendent from the collar by a like chain a hurt charged with a garb also gold.

Town hall

The borough council initially had no single administrative headquarters with offices based in various parts of the town. A former warehouse in Warren Street was used to house council meetings as well as the magistrates court, police station and cells. The foundation stone of the town hall was laid in October 1904, with the top stone of the clock tower being laid by the Mayor of Stockport in January 1907. The "wedding cake" town hall was designed by Sir Alfred Brumwell Thomas, who was also responsible for Belfast City Hall.

Stockport Corporation Transport
The borough council took over the privately operated horse tram networks in the town in 1901 and replaced them with electric trams. At its peak the tramways department had 85 trams and had joint running agreements with the neighbouring municipalities of Manchester and Hyde, and the network extended outside the borough boundaries to Hazel Grove and Gatley. The trams were replaced with motorbuses in 1949–1951. Trams and buses operated in a red and ivory livery. The operation passed to SELNEC Passenger Transport Executive in 1969.

Water supply
Under the terms of the Stockport Corporation Act 1901, the corporation supplied water to an area of eighty square miles including and surrounding the borough. A reservoir was constructed at Kinder, in the Derbyshire Peak District. At the time of its construction it was stated to have the largest earth dam in the world. In the 1930s the corporation acquired land in the Goyt Valley, building two more reservoirs: Fernilee opened in 1938 and Errwood in 1967. The Stockport and District Water Board was formed, with its membership made up of members of Stockport Borough Council, the urban district councils of Alderley Edge, Bredbury and Romiley, Cheadle and Gatley, Hazel Grove and Bramhall, Marple, New Mills, Whaley Bridge and Wilmslow and Disley Rural District Council. The Water Board's assets passed to the North West Water Authority under the Water Act 1973.

References

Local government in the Metropolitan Borough of Stockport
Districts of England abolished by the Local Government Act 1972
County boroughs of England
County Borough
History of Cheshire